Sjur Hopperstad (30 October 1930 – 28 September 2015) was a Norwegian politician for the Centre Party.

A farmer from Vangsnes, he was a member of Balestrand municipality council from 1960 to 1964. That year the area around Vangsnes was moved to Vik municipality, and so Hopperstad became a municipality council member there. He served as mayor from 1974-87. He was also a member of the county council from 1964-75 and 1980-99. Since 1992 he served as county mayor, and from 1995 as deputy county mayor.

References

1930 births
2015 deaths
Centre Party (Norway) politicians
Mayors of places in Sogn og Fjordane
Chairmen of County Councils of Norway